Amasi is a Southern Bantoid language of Cameroon.

The language has no ISO code, as it had been thought a dialect of Manta, a Southwest Grassfields (Western Momo) language.

References
Blench, Roger (2010) Classification of Momo and West Momo

Momo languages
Languages of Cameroon